John King (7 February 1865 – 20 May 1938) was an Irish sailor in the United States Navy and one of only 19 in history to receive the Medal of Honor twice.

Biography
Born in the village of Currabee, near Ballinrobe (then in County Galway, now County Mayo), Ireland, King was allegedly involved in an incident at Cornmarket Ballinrobe, a result of which he was being sought by the R.I.C. (Royal Irish Constabulary). He walked 18 miles to Tuam Co Galway and took the train, rather than going from Ballinrobe railway station, eventually arriving in then Queenstown, now Cobh Co Cork. He then worked for his passage to the USA. King later enlisted in the Navy as a coal passer in Vermont on 20 July 1893.

King received his first Medal of Honor while in Vicksburg "for extraordinary heroism in the line of his profession at the time of the accident to the boilers... May 29, 1901." Advanced to chief watertender on 1 October 1909, he continued to serve at sea until discharged in 1916.

The beginning of World War I, however, brought Chief King back on active duty; he served in New York until 20 August 1919.

He lived in retirement until his death on 20 May 1938.

He is buried in the Calvary Cemetery in Hot Springs, Arkansas.

Legacy
In January 1960 a US navy destroyer was launched and named . It paid a visit to Dublin, Ireland in December 1961 under the command of Commander Albert.M. Sackett, who subsequently unveiled a plaque in remembrance of John King at Ballinrobe, Co. Mayo, Ireland. Members of the Burke and Flannery families, living relatives of John King attended. Some members of the Burke and Flannery families from Ballinrobe were hosted on board the John King at Dublin.

On 4 September 2010, a statue of King was unveiled in Ballinrobe by Irish Minister of Defense Tony Killeen. Present at the ceremony was a relative, Ann Reid, whose father was King's nephew. She remarked, "My dad used to talk about him all the time. On his visits to Ballinrobe from America, he would throw sweets and coins to the children of the town."

Michael Burke, Dun Laoghaire co. Dublin and originally from Cavan Ballinrobe Co. Mayo, a living relative, spoke at the unveiling and recalled some of the times he as a young man met and ran errands for John King.

Pupils from Ballinrobe NS added a touch of naval flavour to the occasion by accompanying a float the Ballinrobe Scout group constructed of the destroyer USS John King to the ceremony, towed into the arena by a vintage tractor. Former crew members of the USS John King representing the USS John King association, participated in the ceremony and a unit of the U.S. Navy Band from Naples, Italy were also present.

Awards
Medal of Honor (2 awards)
Sampson Medal
Spanish Campaign Medal
Philippine Campaign Medal
World War I Victory Medal

Medal of Honor citations

1st Medal of Honor
Rank and organization: Watertender, U.S. Navy. Born: 7 February 1865, Ireland. Accredited to: New York. G.O. No.: 72, 6 December 1901. Second award.

Citation:

On board the U.S.S. Vicksburg, for heroism in the line of his profession at the time of the accident to the boilers, 29 May 1901.

2nd Medal of Honor
G.O. No.: 40, 19 October 1909.

Citation:

Watertender, serving on board the U.S.S. Salem, for extraordinary heroism in the line of his profession on the occasion of the accident to one of the boilers of that vessel, 13 September 1909.

See also

 List of Medal of Honor recipients
 List of Medal of Honor recipients during Peacetime

References

 
 http://www.independent.ie/national-news/naval-heroism-remembered-2326084.html
 https://web.archive.org/web/20060430232025/http://www.thewildgeese.com/pages/mdohhome.html
 http://www.homeofheroes.com/moh/citations_peace/king_john.html

1865 births
1938 deaths
19th-century Irish people
American military personnel of the Philippine–American War
American military personnel of the Spanish–American War
Double Recipients of the Medal of Honor
Irish emigrants to the United States (before 1923)
Irish sailors in the United States Navy
Irish-born Medal of Honor recipients
Military personnel from County Mayo
Non-combat recipients of the Medal of Honor
People from County Galway
United States Navy Medal of Honor recipients
United States Navy sailors
United States Navy personnel of World War I